The 35th Young Artist Awards ceremony, presented by the Young Artist Association, honored excellence of young performers between the ages of 5 to 21 in the fields of film, television, theatre and the internet for the 2013 calendar year.  Nominations were announced on March 30, 2014.  Winners were announced on May 4, 2014, at the annual ceremony and banquet luncheon held in the Empire Ballroom of the Sportsmen's Lodge in Studio City, California.  Live entertainment for the event included 19-year-old country music artist Kaitlyn Baker.

Competitive categories for the 35th annual ceremony recognized young film, television, theatrical and internet performers in leading, supporting, guest-starring, recurring and voice-over roles, as well as ensemble casts.  Receiving the most nominations for the year is the Hub Network program Spooksville, leading with a total of nine nominations.  Voting was undertaken by former Youth in Film Award/Young Artist Award winners, from 1979 to 2011.

Established in 1978 by long-standing Hollywood Foreign Press Association member, Maureen Dragone, the Young Artist Association was the first organization to establish an awards ceremony specifically set to recognize and award the contributions of performers under the age of 21 in the fields of film, television, theater and music.

Categories
★ Winners were announced on May 4, 2014.

Best Performance in a Feature Film

Best Performance in a Feature Film - Leading Young Actor
★ Miles Elliot - Camp - Roebuck Media
Skylan Brooks - The Inevitable Defeat of Mister & Pete - Lionsgate
Chandler Canterbury - Standing Up - Aldamisa Entertainment
Liam James - The Way Way Back - Sycamore Pictures
Maxim Knight - Medeas - Keyhole Productions

Best Performance in a Feature Film - Leading Young Actress
★ Sophie Nélisse - The Book Thief - 20th Century Fox
★ Loreta Peralta - Instructions Not Included - Pantelion Films
Annalise Basso - Standing Up - Aldamisa Entertainment
Megan Charpentier - Mama - Universal Pictures
Abigail Hargrove - World War Z - Paramount Pictures

Best Performance in a Feature Film - Supporting Young Actor
★ Callan McAuliffe - The Great Gatsby - Warner Brothers
River Alexander - The Way Way Back - Sycamore Pictures
Cole Coker - Suddenly - Vivendi Entertainment
Justin Tinucci - Standing Up - Aldamisa Entertainment
Jake Vaughn - Medeas - Keyhole Productions

Best Performance in a Feature Film - Supporting Young Actress
★ Fátima Ptacek - Tio Papi - JMC Independent
Giselle Eisenberg - The Wolf of Wall Street - Paramount Pictures
Gianna Gomez - Camp - Roebuck Media
Mimi Kirkland - Safe Haven - Relativity Media
Laura Krystine - Instructions Not Included - Pantelion Films
Morgan McGarry - Mama - Universal Pictures
Katelyn Mager - Percy Jackson: Sea of Monsters - 20th Century Fox
Isabelle Nélisse - Mama - Universal Pictures
Gracie Prewitt - Her - Warner Brothers

Best Performance in a Short Film

Best Performance in a Short Film - Young Actor 16-21
★ David Topp - The Box - Topp Scot Productions
Connor Beardmore - Insecurbia - UBC/Kori/Depauw
Austin MacDonald - Portrait of Ryan - Badon Hill Productions
Caleb Thomas - Mrs. Sweeney - Cagle/Kinmont Productions
Austin James Wolff - Sugar - J. Johnson Productions

Best Performance in a Short Film - Young Actor 13-15
★ Peter Bundic - Lord of The Guys - SFU
Christopher Bones - The Curse of The Un-Kissable Kid - MarrMark Productions
Jake Davidson - Mrs. Sweeney - Cagle/Kinmont Productions
Dawson Dunbar - Favorite Things - Agriotherium Films
Myles Erlick - Sing Along - Oxman Productions
Max Humphreys - Spin the Barrel - Independent
Noah Johnson - The Ladder - SWYFT Productions
William Leon - The Curse of The Un-Kissable Kid - MarrMark Productions
Mark Ramsay - Way Charn! The Legend of Scrin Pipjaw - Ryerson Films
Chad Roberts - Plain White Tee - Independent

Best Performance in a Short Film - Young Actress 13-21
★ Chanel Marriott - - USC-Cinamatic Arts
Megan Brown - Our TownPenny Arcade  - Arrowhead Productions
Adrienne Hicks - The Mary Contest - Independent
Jennifer Jolliff - On Becoming a Man - Brand New Day Productions
Laci Kay - The Lesson - Ooh La La Productions
Shannon Kummer - Mrs. Sweeney - Cagle/Kinmont Productions
Ruka Felicity Nagashima - Box of Hearts - Independent
Kalia Prescott - Sugar - J. Johnson Productions
Liv Southard - The Curse of the Un-Kissable Kid - MarrMark Productions
Sofie Uretsky - Naughty or Nice - York University

Best Performance in a Short Film - Young Actor 11-12
★ Joshua Costea - Lord of the Guys - SFU
Brady Bryson - The Specifics - Immaginaire Films
Brice Evan Fisher - Mothership - Independent
Reese Gonzales - White Shoe - Fotocomics Productions
Joseph Haag - The Curse of The Un-Kissable Kid - MarrMark Productions

Best Performance in a Short Film - Young Actress 11-12
★ Adanna Avon - The Mary Contest - Independent
Angelique Marion Berry - Anna's Wish - Mitchell Verigin Productions/G5 Films
Ava Cantrell - Above the 101 - Punching Bees Productions
Kylie Cast - Last Round - Percolating Pictures
Kaitlin Cheung - 13 Santas - T. Hansen Productions
Alyssa Brianne Miller - Mrs. Sweeney - Cagle-Kinmont Productions

Best Performance in a Short Film - Young Actor 10 and Under
★ Jonah Wineberg - Circles - Circle Productions
Alexander Davis - Senior Drivers - Hayes Harris Productions
Richard Davis - To Look Away - Ryerson Short Feature
Zander Faden - Dirty Laundry - AFI
Zachary Haven - Mrs. Sweeney - Cagle/Kinmont Productions
Jakob Wedel - 1982 - Atom Films

Best Performance in a Short Film - Young Actress 10 and Under
★ Peyton Kennedy - To Look Away - Ryerson Films
Allison Augustin - Clean Teeth Wednesdays - Boomerang Films
Giovanna Cappetta Cesare - Charity Case - Jnine Media
Maia Costea - Heny and Gloria - Burnaby
Emily Delahunty - Bike Tales - Chaconia Pictures
Erika Forest - Bike Tales - Chaconia Pictures
Madeline Lupi - American Autumn - Les Films Sur Mer

Best Performance in a TV Movie, Miniseries, Special or Pilot

Best Performance in a TV Movie, Miniseries, Special or Pilot - Young Actor
★ Kyle Harrison Breitkopf - Catch a Christmas Star - Hallmark Channel
Griffin Cleveland - Santa Switch - Hallmark Channel
Christian Distefano - Finding Christmas - Hallmark Channel
Sean Michael Kyer - Hats Off to Christmas - Hallmark Channel

Best Performance in a TV Movie, Miniseries, Special or Pilot - Young Actress
★ Savannah McReynolds - The Wrong Woman - Lifetime
Ella Ballentine - Clara's Deadly Secret - Lifetime
Bianca D'Ambrosio - Marked - SyFy
Julia Lalonde - Catch a Christmas Star - Hallmark Channel
Madison McAleer - House of Versace - Lifetime
Annie Thurman - Santa Switch - Hallmark Channel

Best Performance in a TV Series

Best Performance in a TV Series - Leading Young Actor
★ Chandler Riggs - The Walking Dead - AMC
Keean Johnson - Spooksville - The Hub Network
Nathan McLeod - Life with Boys - Nickelodeon

Best Performance in a TV Series - Leading Young Actress
★ Layla Crawford - The First Family - Entertainment Studios
Katie Douglas - Spooksville - The Hub Network
Chloe Lang - LazyTown - Sprout
Olivia Scriven - Degrassi: The Next Generation - CTV

Best Performance in a TV Series - Supporting Young Actor
★ Max Burkholder - Parenthood - NBC
Tyree Brown - Parenthood - NBC
Maxim Knight - Falling Skies - TNT
Xolo Mariduena - Parenthood - NBC
McCarrie McCausland - Army Wives - Lifetime
Nick Purcha - Spooksville - The Hub Network
Albert Tsai - Trophy Wife - ABC

Best Performance in a TV Series - Supporting Young Actress
★ Isabella Cramp - The Neighbors - ABC
Morgan Taylor Campbell - Spooksville - The Hub Network
Alisha Newton - Heartland - CBC
Savannah Paige Rae - Parenthood - NBC

Best Performance in a TV Series - Guest Starring Young Actor 17-21
★ Evan Crooks - Grey's Anatomy - ABC
★ Dominik Michon-Dagenais - 30 Vies - Radio-Canada (TV)
Tajh Bellow - The First Family - Entertainment One
Austin Fryberger - Sam & Cat - Nickelodeon

Best Performance in a TV Series - Guest Starring Young Actress 17-21
★ Siobhan Williams - Motive - ABC
Laine MacNeil - R. L. Stine's The Haunting Hour - The Hub Network
Tiera Skovbye - Spooksville - The Hub Network

Best Performance in a TV Series - Guest Starring Young Actor 14-16
★ Matt Cornett - Southland - Turner Network
★ Matthew J. Evans Lab Rats - Disney XD
C.J. Berdahl - Shameless - Showtime
Joe DiGiovanni - Deadtime Stories - Nickelodeon
Zayne Emory - A.N.T. Farm - Disney Channel
Christian Hutcherson - See Dad Run - Nickelodeon
Joey Luthman - A.N.T. Farm - Disney Channel
Owen Teague - NCIS: Los Angeles - CBS
Justin Tinucci - Trophy Wife - ABC

Best Performance in a TV Series - Guest Starring Young Actress 14-16
★ Danika Yarosh - 1600 Penn - NBC
 Lizze Broadway - Bones - FOX
 Mandalynn Carlson - Scandal - ABC
 Madison Leisle - Touch - FOX

Best Performance in a TV Series - Guest Starring Young Actor 11-13
★ Joshua Carlon - Sam & Cat - Nickelodeon
Jake Elliott - Kickin' It - Disney XD
Sam Humphreys - Seed - Rogers Media
Sean Michael Kyer - Spooksville - The Hub Network
Toby Nichols - American Horror Story - FX
Darien Provost - Package Deal - City TV

Best Performance in a TV Series - Guest Starring Young Actress 11-13
★ Ava Cantrell - The Haunted Hathaways - Nickelodeon
★ Lexi DiBenedetto - Grey's Anatomy - ABC
Tara-Nicole Azarian - Supreme Justice with Judge Karen - Entertainment Studios
Brielle Barbusca - Modern Family - ABC
Cameron Protzman - Mad Men - AMC
Rowan Rycroft - R. L. Stine's The Haunting Hour - The Hub Network
Paris Smith - Modern Family - ABC

Best Performance in a TV Series - Guest Starring Young Actor 10 and Under
★ Christian Distefano - Murdoch Mysteries - CBC
Raphael Alejandro - Almost Human - FOX
Felix Avitia - Bones - FOX
Thomas Barbusca - The New Normal - NBC
Tate Berney - Sons of Anarchy - FX
Kyle Harrison Breitkopf - Satisfaction - CTV

Best Performance in a TV Series - Guest Starring Young Actress 10 and Under
★ Jena Skodje - R. L. Stine's The Haunting Hour - The Hub Network
Chiara D'Ambrosio - Legit - FX
Arcadia Kendal - Murdoch Mysteries - CBC
Kyla-Drew Simmons - How I Met Your Mother - CBS

Best Performance in a TV Series - Recurring Young Actor 17-21
★ Mikey Reid - Victorious - Nickelodeon
Samuel Patrick Chu - Spooksville - The Hub Network
Brock Ciarelli - The Middle - ABC
Evan Crooks - The Carrie Diaries - CW
Harrison Houde - Spooksville - The Hub Network
Austin MacDonald - Life with Boys - Nickelodeon

Best Performance in a TV Series - Recurring Young Actress 17-21
★ Kelly Heyer - Raising Hope - FOX
Laine MacNeil - The Killing - AMC
Katlin Mastandrea - The Middle - ABC

Best Performance in a TV Series - Recurring Young Actor
★ William Monette - 30 Vies - Radio-Canada (TV)
LJ Benet - Dog with a Blog - Disney Channel
Nathan O'Toole - Vikings - History Channel
Brandon Soo Hoo - Supah Ninjas - Nickelodeon
Ethan Ross Wills - Granite Flats - BYU TV
Robbie Tucker - See Dad Run - Nickelodeon

Best Performance in a TV Series - Recurring Young Actress
★ Kayla Maisonet - Dog with a Blog - Disney Channel
Jaylen Barron - Good Luck Charlie - Disney Channel
Haley Pullos - Instant Mom - Nick Jr.
Danika Yarosh - See Dad Run - Nickelodeon

Best Performance in a TV Series - Recurring Young Actor 10 and Under
★ Rio Mangini - Kickin' It - Disney XD
Cole Sand - Masters of Sex - Showtime
J.J. Totah - Jessie - Disney Channel

Best Performance in a Daytime TV Series - Young Actor
★ Jimmy Deshler - General Hospital - ABC
Daniel Polo - The Young and the Restless - CBS

Best Performance in a Daytime TV Series - Young Actress
★ Haley Pullos - General Hospital - ABC
Johnnie Ladd - The Young and the Restless - CBS
McKenna Roberts - The Young and the Restless - CBS
Brooklyn Rae Silzer - General Hospital - ABC

Outstanding Young Ensemble in a TV Series
★ Parenthood - NBC
Savannah Paige Rae, Tyree Brown, Max Burkholder, Xolo Maridueña
Spooksville - The Hub Network
Katie Douglas, Keean Johnson, Nick Purcha, Morgan Taylor Campbell

Best Performance in a Voice-Over Role

Best Performance in a Voice-Over Role - Young Actor
★ Jaden Betts - Doc McStuffins - Disney Channel
Zach Callison - Steven Universe - Cartoon Network
Devan Cohen - PAW Patrol - Nickelodeon
Christian Distefano - Peg + Cat - PBS
Jacob Ewaniuk - The Cat in the Hat Knows a Lot About That! - PBS

Best Performance in a Voice-Over Role - Young Actress
★ Alexa Torrington - The Cat in the Hat Knows a Lot About That! - PBS
Sophia Ewaniuk - Ella the Elephant - Disney Channel
Bailey Gambertoglio - Bubble Guppies - Nickelodeon
Kallan Holley -  PAW Patrol - Nickelodeon
Haley B. Powell - Imaginext Adventures - Fisher Price

Best Performance in a DVD Film

Best Performance in a DVD Film - Young Actor
★ Zach Callison - All American Christmas Carol - August Heart Entertainment
★ Darien Provost - Super Buddies - Disney
Austin Anderson - Wiener Dog Nationals - Inception Studios
Julian Feder - Wiener Dog Nationals - Inception Studios
Brandon Tyler Russell - Wiener Dog Nationals - Inception Studios

Best Performance in a DVD Film - Young Actress
★ Kenzie Pallone - Adventures of Bailey: A Night in Cowtown - Hungry Bear Productions
Caitlin Carmichael - Wiener Dog Nationals - Inception Studios
Ruka Felicity Nagashima - The Mark: Redemption - Eagle Films

Best Web Performance

Best Web Performance - Young Actor
★ Joey Luthman - Chosen - Crackle.com
Kyle Agnew - Cowboys and Indians - Epiphany Pictures
Richard Davis - Kid's Town - Kid's Town Productions, Inc.
Jacob Ewaniuk - Kid's Town - Kid's Town Productions, Inc.
Brice Evan Fisher - CollegeHumor Originals - Botown Sound Productions
David Knoll - Kid's Town - Kid's Town Productions, Inc.

Best Web Performance - Young Actress
★ Caitlin Carmichael - Chosen - Crackle.com
Hannah Swain - Spirits - Woggle Box Entertainment
Brandi Alyssa Young - The Dark One - Insidious Set Productions

Best Performance in Live Theater

Best Performance in Live Theater - Young Actor
★ Quinn Van De Keere - The Christmas Coat - Forte Theatre, Vancouver
Caleb McLaughlin - The Lion King - Minskoff Theatre, New York
Matthew Nardozzi - Irving Berlin's America - Wayne YMCA, New Jersey 
Grant Palmer - The Steward of Christendom - Mark Taper Forum, California

Best Performance in Live Theater - Young Actress
★ Jolie Vanier - Detention - Palmer Cultural Center, Switzerland
Ella Ballentine - Les Misérables - Princess of Wales Theatre, Toronto
Madison Brydges - Numbers - Winchester Theatre, Toronto
Saara Chaudry - Les Misérables - Princess of Wales Theatre, Toronto
Alexis Rosinsky - To Dream Again - The Spot Theatre, California

Special awards

Outstanding Live Performance
★ Nate Nordine – Youngest performer in Cirque de la Symphonie

Maureen Dragone Scholarship Award
★ Inner-City Arts – Enriching the lives of children through art

Jackie Coogan Award
Contribution to Youth
★ Tina Jønk Christensen – Excellence in journalism celebrating young artists

Social Relations of Knowledge Institute Award
★ How It's Made – Science Channel

References

External links

Young Artist Awards ceremonies
2013 film awards
2013 television awards
2014 in American cinema
2014 in American television
2014 in California